Stefan Filipkiewicz  (28 July 1879, Tarnów, Austria-Hungary–23 August 1944, Mauthausen-Gusen concentration camp, Nazi Germany) was a Polish painter and designer, notable for his landscapes inspired by the Young Poland movement. He was a leading representative of the Polish art nouveau style of painting.

His landscapes of the Tatra Mountains and the region of Podhale were first exhibited in Kraków in 1899 at the Palace of Art run by the Kraków Society of Friends of Fine Art. Between 1900 and 1908 Filipkiewicz studied at the Academy of Fine Arts in Kraków under Józef Mehoffer, Leon Wyczółkowski, Jan Stanisławski and Józef Pankiewicz.

In 1908, Filipkiewicz joined the Society of Polish Artists. He became the contributing artist to the legendary Zielony Balonik art-and-literary cabaret. In 1929, Filipkiewicz was awarded the Golden Medal of the Universal Exhibition in Poznań. Four years later, he was also awarded by the Polish Academy of Skills for his works. During the 1939 Invasion of Poland he fled to Hungary, where he became an active member of several underground organizations. Arrested by the Gestapo, he was sent to the Mauthausen-Gusen concentration camp where he was murdered.

References 

Biography of Stefan Filipkiewicz at Culture.pl 

Polish landscape painters
19th-century Polish painters
19th-century Polish male artists
20th-century Polish painters
20th-century Polish male artists
1879 births
1944 deaths
People who died in Mauthausen concentration camp
Art Nouveau painters
Polish civilians killed in World War II
Polish people murdered abroad
People from Tarnów
Polish people executed in Nazi concentration camps
Executed people from Lesser Poland Voivodeship
Polish male painters